The Illinois State Senate Election of 2008 determined, along with 19 senators not up for re-election, the membership of the 96th Illinois State Senate. The Democratic Party retained its majority.

Overview

Individual Results

The following are results by individual districts.

2nd District

3rd District

5th District

6th District

7th District

8th District

9th District

11th District

12th District

14th District

15th District

17th District

18th District

20th District

21st District

23rd District

24th District

26th District

27th District

29th District

30th District

32nd District

33rd District

35th District

36th District

38th District

39th District

41st District

42nd district

44th District

45th District

47th District

48th District

50th District

51st District

53rd District

54th District

56th District

57th District

59th District

External links

State Senate
2008
Illinois Senate